Up Close and Personal or variants may refer to:

Up Close and Personal (film), a 1996 film starring Robert Redford and Michelle Pfeiffer

Music
Number Ones, Up Close and Personal, a concert tour by Janet Jackson
Up Close and Personal Tour (Guns N' Roses), 2012
Up Close and Personal Tour, McFly
"Up Close and Personal", a 2006 single by South

Albums
Up Close and Personal (Angie Martinez album), 2001
Up Close and Personal (Judith Durham album), 2009
Up! Close and Personal, Shania Twain DVD
Up Close & Personal (Vicki Genfan album), 2006
Up Close and Personal - Live at SWR1, by Ray Wilson
Up Close and Personal, by Jay Perez
Up Close And Personal! Live In Germany, by Demon